This is a list of songs written and performed by Taiwanese musician and singer Jay Chou. There are 155 songs in total.

Song list

Notes

List omissions
The following releases by Chou are omitted from this list:
EPs
Fantasy Plus 范特西Plus (2001-12-24)
Hidden Track 尋找周杰倫 (2003-11-11)
Fearless 霍元甲 (2006-01-20)
Curse of the Golden Flower 黃金甲 (2006-12-7)
Live albums
The One Concert Live 2002The One演唱會 (2002-10-21)
Incomparable Concert Live 2004無與倫比演唱會 (2004-12-03)
2007 World Tour Concert Live 2007世界巡迴演唱會 (2008-01-31)
The Era Concert Live 2010超時代演唱會 (2011-01-25)
Opus Jay Concert Live 2013魔天倫演唱會 (2016-05-10)
Soundtrack albums
Secret 不能說的秘密 (2007-08-13)
The Rooftop 天台 (2013-07-12)
Compilation albums
Partners (2002-04-26)
Initial J: Jay Chou's Greatest Hits (2005-08-31)
Other works

Music genre/style definitions
Chou's combines a number of popular and culturally-distinct music styles. The following criteria are used to categorize music styles mentioned in the above list:

Common styles used in Chou's music:
 R&B  Contemporary R&B is a genre of pop music, characterized by smooth vocal arrangements and a smooth beat. This is very different from traditional "Rhythm and Blues" which is not usually used in Chou's compositions.
 "Zhong guo feng"  Chou has popularized a style of music called "Zhong guo feng", which means "Chinese Style" (中國風). ("Feng" on its own means "wind," but in context it is a shortening of the phrase "feng ge" (風格), meaning characteristic style or genre.) Zhong guo feng features traditional Chinese instruments and Western instruments, sometimes written in the Pentatonic Scale. Lyrics may be in the form of Chinese poetry and discuss themes related with Chinese history and folklore. 
 Hip hop  Rap and beat-heavy; may involve use of scratch, sound sampling, synthesizer music.
 Pop  Although "pop music" can be used to describe any music that is popular, pop music refers to songs with a simple melody and beat, having a repetitive structure, and is easy to sing along.
 Rock  Music with heavy use of guitar, drums, bass; strong beat.
 Soft rock  A genre of rock music, using similar instruments and others such as the piano. Lyrics are usually "less confrontational" than rock music.
 Electronic  A general term for music where the instrumental track is largely synthesizer-based.
 Classical  Classical music in this article refers to Western classical music styles of the Baroque, Classical, and Romantic era (1600-1910).
 Orchestra music  A genre of classical music. Instruments include woodwinds, brass, percussion, and strings.

Less common styles used in Chou's music:
 Hip hop soul  A genre of R&B and soul singing styles, mixed with hip hop beats. Lyrics tend to be darker in theme.
 Spanish  Involves distinct Spanish musical styles such as Flamenco music and the use of instruments such as the Flamenco guitar.
 Tango  See Tango and Argentine music
 Bossanova  A type of music which originated from Brazil.
 Lullaby  Tonally simple music intended for children.

References

Album notes
Jay. In Jay 周杰倫同名專輯 [CD liner notes] (2000). Taipei, Taiwan [R.O.C.]: Alfa Music International Co., Ltd.
Fantasy. In Fantasy 范特西 [CD liner notes] (2001). Taipei, Taiwan [R.O.C.]: Alfa Music International Co., Ltd.
Eight Dimensions. In Eight Dimensions 八度空間 [CD liner notes] (2002). Taipei, Taiwan [R.O.C.]: Alfa Music International Co., Ltd.
Yeh Hui-mei. In Yeh Hui-mei 葉惠美 [CD liner notes] (2003). Taipei, Taiwan [R.O.C.]: Alfa Music International Co., Ltd.
Common Jasmin Orange. In Common Jasmin Orange 七里香 [CD liner notes] (2004). Taipei, Taiwan [R.O.C.]: Alfa Music International Co., Ltd.
November's Chopin. In November's Chopin 十一月的蕭邦 [CD liner notes] (2005). Taipei, Taiwan [R.O.C.]: Alfa Music International Co., Ltd.
Still Fantasy. In Still Fantasy 依然范特西 [CD liner notes] (2006). Taipei, Taiwan [R.O.C.]: Alfa Music International Co., Ltd.

Chou, Jay
Songs